Zoe Wees is a German singer. Her debut single "Control" charted in several nations including number one in France (SNEP Radio) and the top ten in Belgium.

Background 
Wees grew up in Hamburg. She has lived with benign rolandic epilepsy (BRE), a syndrome that caused her to have feelings of exclusion from others, helplessness, and loss of control. Wees stated, "The sickness was stronger than me, and left scars that have become part of my life. Accepting them has taken so much time, but they make me what I am today: a fighter."

Wees' music has been described as "raw, deeply emotional" that ranges "from raspy low to unbelievably powerful and sky high". Wees can often be found playing the piano or guitar.

Wees attended the Grund- und Stadtteilschule Alter Teichweg, a school in Dulsberg.

Career 
Wees has written music in English since childhood. She began working on music as a teenager when her teacher came up to her after a school concert wanting to work with her on music. In early 2017, Wees took part in the fifth season of the music talent show The Voice Kids. Wees joined pop singer Sasha's team in the Blind Auditions. In the Sing-Offs, the third of five phases in the competition, Wees was eliminated. Wees released the song "Control" on 13 March 2020. The song is written about anxiety and not being in control, but more specifically, about her battle with benign rolandic epilepsy. Her mission in writing the song was to say thank you to her primary school teacher who pushed her along as a young girl into becoming who she is today.

On 19 April, Wees released "Ghost", part of her debut EP Golden Wings, which was released on 21 May via Capitol Records. Wees said that "Ghost" was written about letting someone get too close even if you know they can hurt you and about being vulnerable to that person in a way that could essentially destroy your life. Ghost was co-written by Ricardo Muñoz Repko, VVAVES, Nicolas Rebscher, and Patrick Salmy.

Musical style and influences 
Wees noted that she listened to Jessie J and Miley Cyrus as she grew up. Artists that she cited as influences include Jessie J and Lewis Capaldi. She describes her genre as pop.

Discography

Extended play

Singles

As lead artist

As featured artist

Promotional singles

Awards and nominations

Results

Notes

References

External links

German women pop singers
Musicians from Hamburg
Living people
English-language singers from Germany
German women singer-songwriters
21st-century German women writers
21st-century German women singers
Year of birth missing (living people)